Dirty Sally is a humorous western television series about a hard-drinking cantankerous old woman and a young former outlaw traveling to the California gold fields in a wagon pulled by a mule named Worthless. The series consists of 14 half-hour episodes that aired on CBS Fridays, 8:00 to 8:30 p.m., from January 11, 1974, to July 19, 1974. Jeanette Nolan stars as Sally Fergus and Dack Rambo stars as Cyrus Pike in this Gunsmoke spin-off. Guest stars include John McIntire, Tim McIntire, Jackie Coogan, and Kathleen Cody. Nolan was nominated for an Emmy Award for her role in the series.

During the 16th season of Gunsmoke, a two-part episode titled "Pike" was broadcast on March 1 and March 8, 1971. Dirty Sally, an old woman who collected bottles and other discarded items to sell, found outlaw Cyrus Pike, who had been shot. Sally nursed Pike back to health and tried to protect him from the men who wanted him dead. The Gunsmoke office received more mail about the episode then any other segment in the series' history. The character of Dirty Sally was brought back during the next season of Gunsmoke in an episode titled "One for the Road". The character was spun off into a new series.

Dirty Sally was produced by the CBS Television Network at the CBS Studio Center in Hollywood. John Mantley was the executive producer, Leonard Katzman the producer, and Jack Miller was creator and story consultant. All three were on the production team for Gunsmoke.

In the plot, Pike is anxious to reach California, but their journey is often delayed by Sally becoming involved with the problems of people they meet.

Episodes

References

CBS original programming
1974 American television series debuts
1974 American television series endings
1970s Western (genre) television series
American television spin-offs
Gunsmoke